Voice of Reason is a 1995 album by the Canadian hard rock band Harem Scarem. "Blue" was released as a promotional single and there was a music video for it. After this album was released, bass player Mike Gionet was replaced with Barry Donaghy.

Track listing

Personnel
Band members
Harry Hess – lead vocals, guitar, producer.
Pete Lesperance – lead guitar, backing vocals, producer.
Mike Gionet – bass, backing vocals.
Darren Smith – drums, backing vocals.

Production
Harry Hess, Pete Lesperancei - Producers.
Harry Hess - Recording engineer.
Kevin Doyle - Mixing engineer.
Tom Trafalski – Assistant Engineer.
Greg Calbi – Mastering Engineer.

References 

1995 albums
Harem Scarem albums
Warner Music Group albums